Allen Curtis Jenkins (born Alfred McGonegal; April 9, 1900 – July 20, 1974) was an American character actor and singer who worked on stage, film, and television.

Life and career

Jenkins was born on Staten Island, New York, on April 9, 1900.

In 1959, Jenkins played the role of elevator operator Harry in the comedy Pillow Talk. He was a member of Hollywood's so-called "Irish Mafia", a group of Irish-American actors and friends which included Spencer Tracy, James Cagney, Pat O'Brien and Frank McHugh.

Jenkins later voiced the character of Officer Charlie Dibble on the Hanna-Barbera TV cartoon, Top Cat (1961–62). He was a regular on the television sitcom Hey, Jeannie! (1956–57), starring Jeannie Carson and often portrayed Muggsy on the 1950s-1970s CBS series The Red Skelton Show. He was also a guest star on many other television programs, such as The Man from U.N.C.L.E., Mr. & Mrs. North, I Love Lucy, Playhouse 90, The Tab Hunter Show, The Ernie Kovacs Show, Zane Grey Theater, and Your Show of Shows. He had a cameo appearance in It's a Mad, Mad, Mad, Mad World (1963). Eleven days before his death, he made his final appearance, at the end of Billy Wilder's remake of The Front Page (1974); it was released posthumously.

Death
Jenkins died of lung cancer on July 20, 1974, at age 74. His body was cremated, and the ashes were scattered at sea.

Complete filmography

Film

Straight and Narrow (1931, Short) as Ex-convict
The Girl Habit (1931) as Tony Maloney
Grand Hotel (1932) as Hotel Meat Packer (uncredited)
Blessed Event (1932) as Frankie Wells
Rackety Rax (1932) as Mike Dumphy
Three on a Match (1932) as Dick
I Am a Fugitive from a Chain Gang (1932) as Barney Sykes
Lawyer Man (1932) as Izzy Levine
Employees' Entrance (1933) as Sweeney (uncredited)
Hard to Handle (1933) as Radio Announcer
42nd Street (1933) as Mac Elroy
Blondie Johnson (1933) as Louie
The Keyhole (1933) as Hank
The Mind Reader (1933) as Frank
Tomorrow at Seven (1933) as Dugan
Professional Sweetheart (1933) as O'Connor
The Silk Express (1933) as Robert "Rusty" Griffith
The Mayor of Hell (1933) as Mike
Bureau of Missing Persons (1933) as Joe Musik
'Tis Spring (1933, Short)
Havana Widows (1933) as Herman Brody
The Big Shakedown (1934) as Lefty
Bedside (1934) as Sam Sparks
I've Got Your Number (1934) as Johnny
Jimmy the Gent (1934) as Lou
Whirlpool (1934) as Mac
Twenty Million Sweethearts (1934) as Pete
The Merry Frinks (1934) as Emmett Frinks
The Case of the Howling Dog (1934) as Sgt. Halcomb
Happiness Ahead (1934) as Chuck
The St. Louis Kid (1934) as Buck
Sweet Music (1935) as Barney Cowan
A Night at the Ritz (1935) as Gyp Beagle
While the Patient Slept (1935) as Jackson
The Case of the Curious Bride (1935) as Spudsy Drake
The Irish in Us (1935) as 'Carbarn'
Page Miss Glory (1935) as Patsy
I Live for Love (1935) as Mac
The Case of the Lucky Legs (1935) as Spudsy Drake
Miss Pacific Fleet (1935) as Bernard "Kewpie" Wiggins
Broadway Hostess (1935) as Fishcake
The Singing Kid (1936) as Joe Eddy
Sins of Man (1936) as Crusty
Cain and Mabel (1936) as Aloysius K. Reilly
Three Men on a Horse (1936) as Charlie
Sing Me a Love Song (1936) as "Chris" Cress
Ready, Willing, and Able (1937) as J. Van Courtland
Marked Woman (1937) as Louie
A Day at Santa Anita (1937 short) as Allen Jenkins (uncredited)
Ever Since Eve (1937) as Jake Edgall
The Singing Marine (1937) as Sergeant Mike Kelly
Dance Charlie Dance (1937) as Alf Morgan
Marry the Girl (1937) as Spees
Dead End (1937) as Hunk
The Perfect Specimen (1937) as Pinky
Sh! The Octopus (1937) as Dempsey
Swing Your Lady (1938) as Shiner
A Slight Case of Murder (1938) as Mike
Fools for Scandal (1938) as Dewey Gilson
Gold Diggers in Paris (1938) as Duke "Dukie" Dennis
Racket Busters (1938) as 'Sheets' Wilson
The Amazing Dr. Clitterhouse (1938) as Okay
Hard To Get  (1938) as Roscoe
Heart of the North (1938) as Cpl. Bill Hardsock
Going Places (1938) as Droopy
Sweepstakes Winner (1939) as Xerxes "Tip" Bailey
Naughty but Nice (1939) as Joe Dirk
Five Came Back (1939) as Pete
Torchy Blane... Playing with Dynamite (1939) as Lt. Steve McBride
Destry Rides Again (1939) as Gyp Watson
Oh Johnny, How You Can Love (1940) as Ed, aka "The Weasel"
Brother Orchid (1940) as Willie "the Knife" Corson
Margie (1940) as Kenneth
Meet the Wildcat (1940) as Max Schwydel
Tin Pan Alley (1940) as Casey
Footsteps in the Dark (1941) as Wilfred
Time Out for Rhythm (1941) as Off-Beat Davis
Dive Bomber (1941) as 'Lucky' James
The Gay Falcon (1941) as Jonathan "Goldie" Locke
Go West, Young Lady (1941) as Deputy Hank
Ball of Fire (1941) as Garbage Man
A Date with the Falcon (1942) as Jonathan "Goldie" Locke
Tortilla Flat (1942) as Portagee Joe 
The Falcon Takes Over (1942) as Jonathan "Goldie" Locke
Maisie Gets Her Man (1942) as "Pappy" Goodring
They All Kissed the Bride (1942) as Johnny Johnson
Eyes in the Night (1942) as Marty
My Wife's an Angel (1943, Short)
Stage Door Canteen (1943) as Himself
Wonder Man (1945) as Chimp
Lady on a Train (1945) as Danny
Voice of the Whistler (1945) as a restaurant patron (uncredited)
Meet Me on Broadway (1946) as Deacon Trimble
The Dark Horse (1946) as Willis Trimble
Singin' in the Corn (1946) as Glen Cummings
Easy Come, Easy Go (1947) as Nick
Fun on a Weekend (1947) as Joe Morgan
 The Hat Box Mystery (1947) as "Harvard"
The Case of the Baby Sitter (1947 short) as Howard "Harvard" Quinlan
Wild Harvest (1947) as Higgins
The Senator Was Indiscreet (1947) as Farrell
The Inside Story (1948) as Eddie
The Big Wheel (1949) as George
Bodyhold (1949) as Slats Henry
Let's Go Navy! (1951) as CPO Mervin Longnecker
Behave Yourself! (1951) as Plainsclothesman
Crazy Over Horses (1951) as Weepin' Willie
Chained for Life (1951) as Hinkley
Oklahoma Annie (1952) as Coffin Creek Café Bartender Lou
The WAC from Walla Walla (1952) as Mr. Reddington
Pillow Talk (1959) as Harry
It's a Mad, Mad, Mad, Mad World (1963) as Policeman (uncredited)
For Those Who Think Young (1964) as Col. Leslie Jenkins
Robin and the 7 Hoods (1964) as Vermin
I'd Rather Be Rich (1964) as Fred
The Spy in the Green Hat (1967) as Enzo "Pretty" Stilletto
Doctor, You've Got to Be Kidding! (1967) as Joe Bonney
Getting Away from It All (1972, TV Movie) as Doorman
The Front Page (1974) as Telegrapher (final film role)

Partial television credits
The Abbott and Costello Show (1953, episode "The Actors' Home") as Retired Actors Home Man on Street
I Love Lucy (1952–1953) (three episodes) as Policeman/Officer Jenkins/Police Sergeant
The Red Skelton Hour (1954–1962) (11 episodes) as Muggsy, a friend of Red Skelton's character Freddie the Freeloader 
Hey, Jeannie! (1956–57) (26 episodes) as Al Murray, a cabbie
Wagon Train (1960, episode "The Horace Best Story") as Mr. Gillespie
The Tab Hunter Show (1961, episode "Sultan for a Day") as Frenchy
Top Cat (1961–1962) (30 episodes) as Officer Charlie Dibble (voice)
The Real McCoys (1962, episode "Army Reunion") as Skinny Howard
The Man from U.N.C.L.E. (1966, episodes "The Concrete Overcoat Affair: Parts 1 & 2") as Enzo "Pretty" Stilletto
Batman (1967, episode "Scat! Darn Catwoman") as Little Al (uncredited)
Bewitched (1971–1972) as Janitor / Cabbie / Alex Johnson

References

External links

1900 births
1974 deaths
American male film actors
American male stage actors
American male television actors
American male voice actors
American people of Irish descent
People from Staten Island
Deaths from lung cancer in California
Male actors from New York City
Hanna-Barbera people
20th-century American male actors